The Northrop XP-79, USAAF project number MX-365, was rocket and jet-powered flying wing fighter aircraft, designed by Northrop. The pilot was seated in a prone position, lying on their stomach, permitting them to withstand much greater g-forces in pitch. It also used a welded magnesium monocoque structure instead of riveted aluminum.

Design and development

In 1942, Jack Northrop conceived the XP-79 as a high-speed rocket-powered flying-wing fighter aircraft. In January 1943, a contract for two prototypes under the XP-79 designation was issued by the United States Army Air Forces (USAAF).

It was planned to use a  thrust XCALR-2000A-1 "rotojet" rocket motor from Aerojet that used mono-ethylaniline fuel and red fuming nitric acid (RFNA) oxidiser. However, the rocket motor, which used canted rockets to drive turbo-pumps was unsatisfactory and the aircraft was fitted with two Westinghouse 19B turbojets and re-designated XP-79B. 

The pilot controlled the XP-79 through a tiller bar and intakes mounted at the wingtips supplied air for the unusual bellows-boosted split elevons which opened differentially to provide lateral (yaw) control, by increasing drag on one side of the aircraft, in addition to providing roll and pitch. The aircraft was also fitted with airbrakes outboard of them, also for yaw control. No rudders were used, and the vertical surfaces were simple fixed fins with no flight controls.

MX-324 and MX-334
Northrop was given a contract to build three glider demonstrators to test the design. Given the Northrop designation NS-12, the three gliders were also given project numbers from the USAAF. Confusingly, two project numbers were used, one MX-324 when discussing secret aspects of the powered gliders, and another, MX-334, relating to the aircraft when being built and flown as pure gliders.

The MX-334 was a flying wing glider with no tail surfaces, similar in layout and construction to the Northrop N-9M. Completed in late Spring 1943, MX-334 No.1 was tested in NACA Langley's wind tunnel, after which a large wire-braced fin was added for directional stability at high speeds. The first flight attempts was carried out by the no.2 aircraft towed behind a Cadillac car for low level take-off and landing tests, with no success. After modifications the first launch was carried out on 4 September 1943, towed behind a large truck. For more comprehensive testing, a Lockheed P-38 Lightning was used to tow the aircraft on 2 October 1943.

In early 1944 the no.2 aircraft was modified to take the  Aerojet XCAL-200 rocket motor, and reverted to the secret MX-324 designation. Testing with the rocket motor commenced on 22 June 1944, with the first aerotow launch for a powered flight on 5 July 1944, making it the first US-built rocket-powered aircraft to fly. Flight testing was concluded by 1 August 1944 and the two remaining aircraft were disposed of. MX-334 no.3 was written off on its second flight, on 10 November 1943, after Harry Crosby lost control in the prop-wash of the P-38 tug.

Testing
Following delays due to burst tires and brake problems during taxiing trials at Muroc dry lake, the XP-79B made its first flight on 12 September 1945, however, 15 minutes into the flight control was lost for unknown reasons while performing a slow roll. The nose dropped, and the roll continued with the aircraft impacting the ground in a vertical spin. Test pilot Harry Crosby had attempted to bail out but was struck by the aircraft and died. Shortly thereafter, the project was canceled along with work on the second prototype.

Variants
Data from: Northrop Flying Wings : a history of Jack Northrop's visionary aircraft
NS-12 Northrop company designation for the MX-324 programme.
NS-14 Northrop designation for the XP-79 programme.
MX-324 The "secret" designation for the powered version of the MX-334 glider. Only used for the no.2 glider, when powered by a single  Aerojet XCAL-200 liquid-fuelled rocket engine.
MX-334 The designation used to describe the pure glider version ( including the no.2 aircraft before it was fitted with the rocket engine).
MX-365 The USAAC project number for the XP-79 programme
XP-79 The initial design for a rocket powered fighter, to have been powered by 2 x  Aerojet XCAL-2000 liquid-fuelled rocket engine.
XP-79B Three aircraft were ordered but only one was completed, crashing on its first flight on 12 September 1945.

Specifications (XP-79B)

See also

References

Bibliography
 
 Pelletier, Alain J. "Towards the Ideal Aircraft: The Life and Times of the Flying Wing, Part Two". Air Enthusiast, No. 65, September–October 1996, pp. 8–19. .

External links

 National Museum of the USAF Fact Sheet: Northrop XP-79B
 Northrop XP-79

P-79
Northrop P-79
Flying wings
Twinjets
Prone pilot aircraft
Cancelled military aircraft projects of the United States
Aircraft first flown in 1945